Adil Satryaguna "Satrio" Hermanto (born June 29, 1984 in Jakarta) is an Indonesian racing driver.

Career

Karting 
He started racing in the Indonesian karting National Championship in 1994.
 1995: National Champion Category intercontinental A
 1996: 3rd Place in National Champion Category Intercontinental A
 1997: National Champion Category intercontinental A
 2005: 9th Place in Grand Finale World Rotax Max

Touring Car 
In 1998, he became national champion in Timor One Make Race Division II.

Formulas 
In 1999 he took the 2nd place in the National Formula Asia and 3rd place in the 2000 Formula Ford Euro Asia Cup in Sentul.

He tested cars in Formula BMW (Team Meritus) at Sepang in 2005, and in Formula Renault (ART Grand Prix and Champ Motorsport) at Zhuhai in 2006.

Hermanto won the Formula 3 Asia Promotion Class in 2006 with the Joson Formula 3 team.

In 2007-08, Hermanto was the race driver for A1 Team Indonesia.

Hermanto competed in two rounds of the 2009 British Formula Three season for Litespeed F3.

Career series results 

 * Season still in progress. (1) = Team standings.

References

External links 
 A1 Team Indonesia drivers at a1-teamindonesia.com
 Driver Statistics at results.a1gp.com
 Career statistic driverdb.com

1984 births
Living people
Indonesian racing drivers
Formula V6 Asia drivers
British Formula Three Championship drivers
German Formula Three Championship drivers
A1 Team Indonesia drivers
Sportspeople from Jakarta
A1 Grand Prix drivers
Asian Formula Three Championship drivers
Team Meritus drivers
Performance Racing drivers
21st-century Indonesian people